The 1936 All-Ireland Minor Hurling Championship was the ninth staging of the All-Ireland Minor Hurling Championship since its establishment by the Gaelic Athletic Association in 1928.

Kilkenny entered the championship as the defending champions.

On 6 September 1936 Kilkenny won the championship following a 2-4 to 2-3 defeat of Cork in the All-Ireland final. This was their second All-Ireland in-a-row.

Results

All-Ireland Minor Hurling Championship

Semi-final

Final

Championship statistics

Miscellaneous

 Kilkenny became the second team after Tipperary to retain the All-Ireland Championship title.

External links
 All-Ireland Minor Hurling Championship: Roll Of Honour

Minor
All-Ireland Minor Hurling Championship